Jastroblje (in older sources Jastroble) is a former settlement in the Municipality of Kamnik in central Slovenia. It is now part of the village of Špitalič. The area is part of the traditional region of Upper Carniola. The municipality is now included in the Central Slovenia Statistical Region.

Geography
Motnišnica Creek flows north of the settlement, and the road to the Lipovec Pasture above Špitalič turns off of the main road at Jastroblje.

Name
Jastroblje was attested as Gasterdorff in 1488. The name Jastroblje is believed to derive from the common noun jastreb 'goshawk; vulture', referring to local fauna. It is related to similar toponyms such as Jastrebci and Jastrebnik.

History
Jastroblje was annexed by Špitalič in 1953, ending its existence as an independent settlement.

References

External links

Jastroblje on Geopedia

Populated places in the Municipality of Kamnik
Former settlements in Slovenia